Harapan may refer to:

Harapan (TV series), Philippines TV series List of programs aired by ABS-CBN 23rd PMPC Star Awards for Television
Harapan, Pakatan Harapan ("Hope Pact") Malaysian political coalition
Harapan (album) ("Hope") by Malaysian singer Francissca Peter released in 1988
Harapan Rainforest
Harapan (rhino), the last Sumatran rhino in North America

See also
Harappan architecture